Mutatis Mutandis is an album of instrumental rock music by Ronnie Montrose.

Track listing 
All tracks written by Ronnie Montrose
 "Mutatis Mutandis" 5:05
 "Right Saddle/Wrong Horse" 4:22
 "Heavy Agenda" 3:52
 "Greed Kills" 3:54
 "Mercury" 3:54
 "Zero Tolerance" 4:15
 "Velox" 3:59
 "Company Policy" 4:01
 "The Nomad" 3:48
 "Tonga" 3:53

Personnel
Ronnie Montrose – Guitars
Dave Moreno– Bass 
Gary Hull - Synthesizers
Steve Bellino - Percussion
Don Frank - Percussion on "The Nomad"
Vocal texturing by Michele Graybeal, Nina Markert and Kirsten Turrigiano

All drum sounds on this album were generated using D Drum II exclusively

Production
Produced by Ronnie Montrose
Engineered by Ronnie Montrose, Roger Wiersema and Mike Hersh

References
Ronnie Montrose; "Mutatis Mutandis" liner notes; I.R.S. Records 1991
[ All Music Guide] 

1991 albums
Ronnie Montrose albums
I.R.S. Records albums